Departure is a studio album by Pat Boone, released in 1969 on Tetragrammaton Records.

Billboard picked the album for its "Spotlight" section.

Track listing

References 

1969 albums
Pat Boone albums
Tetragrammaton Records albums